Frederik Franck Winther (born 4 January 2001) is a Danish professional footballer who plays as a centre-back for Danish Superliga club Brøndby, on loan from Bundesliga club FC Augsburg.

Club career

Lyngby
Winther began his career with B 1903 in 2007 at age six. He progressed through the club's academy to the under-13 team before making the move to the Lyngby youth team in 2014.

Winther progressed through the Lyngby academy while playing matches for his primary school, Kildegård Privatskole in the Ekstra Bladet School Football Tournament in 2016. He made his professional debut on 20 March 2019, replacing Jesper Christjansen in a 2–0 win over Silkeborg in the second-tier Danish 1st Division. He signed a five-year professional contract on 27 May 2019, after making his first appearances for the Lyngby first-team during the 2018–19 season, where Lyngby would also secured promotion to the Danish Superliga. That season he made ten appearances. Winther soon established himself as a first-team regular in the Superliga, attracting interest from Dutch clubs Ajax and PSV, as well as German and Austrian clubs RB Leipzig and Red Bull Salzburg.

FC Augsburg
On 5 October 2020, it was confirmed, that Winther had signed a deal until 2025 with German club FC Augsburg. However, he would remain on loan at Lyngby for the 2020–21 season on a loan deal.

Winther returned to Denmark on 31 January 2023, joining Brøndby on a five-month loan deal. He made his debut for the club on 19 February, starting in a 5–2 home win over AC Horsens.

International career 
Winther made four appearances for the Danish U18 national team. For the Denmark U19 he gained six caps scoring one goal.

References

Living people
2001 births
People from Gentofte Municipality
Sportspeople from the Capital Region of Denmark
Danish men's footballers
Association football defenders
Denmark under-21 international footballers
Denmark youth international footballers
Danish Superliga players
Bundesliga players
Regionalliga players
Lyngby Boldklub players
FC Augsburg players
FC Augsburg II players
Brøndby IF players
Danish expatriate men's footballers
Danish expatriate sportspeople in Germany
Expatriate footballers in Germany